Dinkar Balwant Deodhar (14 January 1892 – 24 August 1993) was an Indian cricketer. He played first-class cricket from 1911 to 1948.

Cricket career 
Deodhar was born in Poona (now Pune), British India. He was a professor of Sanskrit at Pune College.

Popularly known as the Grand Old Man of Indian Cricket, Deodhar was an aggressive right-hand batsman and a leg-break bowler. He captained Maharashtra in Ranji Trophy matches from 1939 to 1941. In his first-class career, he played 81 matches, scoring 4,522 runs at an average of 39.32 with a highest score of 246.

Deodhar was vice-president of the Board of Control for Cricket in India, the President of the Maharashtra Cricket Association, and also a national team selector. The Deodhar Trophy, a limited overs inter-zonal cricket tournament played in India since 1973, is named after him. In 1996, India Post issued a commemorative stamp in his honour. A statue of Deodhar was unveiled at Pune's Sahara cricket stadium in 2012.

Like Bill Ashdown, Deodhar is one of the few people known to have played first-class cricket both before the First World War and after the Second World War, having played in the Bombay Triangular in 1911 and the Ranji Trophy in 1946. In a Ranji Trophy game against Nawanagar in 1944, he scored centuries in both innings, helping his team win. He was aged 53 at the time.

He was awarded the Padma Shri award in 1965 and the Padma Bhushan in 1991 by the Indian Government. He was the first Indian first-class cricketer known to have lived to 100. Vasant Raiji became the second in 2020.

Personal life 
India's former National Badminton Champions Tara Deodhar, Sunder Deodhar, and Suman Deodhar are his daughters.

Legacy
 Board of Control for Cricket in India (BCCI) named Deodhar Trophy, an annual domestic one-day cricket championship in his honour.

References

External links
 

1892 births
1993 deaths
Maharashtra cricketers
Indian cricketers
South Zone cricketers
Hindus cricketers
Indian centenarians
Recipients of the Padma Bhushan in sports
Cricketers from Pune
Recipients of the Padma Shri in sports